Agricola is an unincorporated community in Coffey County, Kansas, United States.

History
Agricola was a station on the Atchison, Topeka and Santa Fe Railway.

Agricola had a post office from the 1875 until 1974. The post office was originally called Hardpan for some time.

References

Further reading

External links
 Coffey County maps: Current, Historic, KDOT

Unincorporated communities in Coffey County, Kansas
Unincorporated communities in Kansas